"Stole the Show" is a song by Norwegian DJ and record producer Kygo, featuring vocals from American singer Parson James. It was released on 23 March 2015, becoming a hit in a number of countries and the biggest commercial success of Kygo besides "Firestone". Later, on 21 August 2015, a solo version by James was released. This version was included in his EP, The Temple.

Track listing

Music video
A music video directed by Saman Kesh was also launched in promotion of the single. The video depicts male and female astronauts that mysteriously crash land on earth, and meet up

Charts and certifications

Weekly charts

Year-end charts

Certifications

Release history

Parson James solo version

On 21 August 2015, a solo version of "Stole the Show" by Parson James was released by RCA Records.

Track listing
Digital download
"Stole the Show" – 3:43

References

2015 singles
2015 songs
Kygo songs
Parson James songs
Number-one singles in Norway
Number-one singles in Sweden
SNEP Top Singles number-one singles
Song recordings produced by Kygo
Songs written by Kygo
Songs written by Michael Harwood (musician)
Songs written by Marli Harwood
Songs written by Parson James
Sony Music singles
Song recordings produced by Mark Ralph (record producer)